The Communist Party of Byelorussia (CPB;) was the ruling communist party of the Byelorussian Soviet Socialist Republic, a constituent republic of the Soviet Union from 1922, that existed from 1917 to 1993.

History 
The party was founded in 1917 as the Communist Party (Bolsheviks) of Byelorussia following the Russian Revolution of 1917 as part of the Russian Communist Party (bolsheviks) led by Vladimir Lenin on December 30–31, 1918 with 17,800 members. It was important in creating the Byelorussian Soviet Republic in January 1919. From February 1919 until 1920 it functioned as a single organisation together with the Communist Party of Lithuania, known as the Communist Party (bolsheviks) of Lithuania and Belorussia. It was renamed to the Communist Party of Byelorussia in 1952.

The CPB was a communist party, organized on democratic centralism. This principle, introduced by Lenin, entails democratic and open discussion of policy issues within the party, followed by the requirement of total unity in upholding the agreed policies. The highest body within the CPB was the Party Congress, which convened every five years. When Congress was not in session, the Central Committee was the highest body. Because the Central Committee met twice a year, most day-to-day duties and responsibilities were vested in the Politburo, (previously the Presidium), the Secretariat. The party leader was the head of government and held the office of either General Secretary, Premier or head of state, or two of the three offices concurrently, but never all three at the same time. The party leader was the de facto chairman of the CPB Politburo and chief executive of the Republic. Ideologically, the CPB embraced Marxism–Leninism, a fusion of the original ideas of German philosopher and economic theorist Karl Marx, and Lenin, became formalized by Joseph Stalin as the party's guiding ideology and would remain so throughout the rest of its existence.

With debate raging regarding Belorussian independence, Byelorussian representatives in Petrograd were far more willing to accept Joseph Stalin’s plans for establishing an autonomous Byelorussian Authority. Byelorussian Communist Party First Secretary Alexander Miasnikian, however, initially having held control of Minsk, was seemingly unwilling to share collective influence regarding the future affairs of Byelorussia. This internal conflict resulted in Byelorussian nationalist leadership attempting to establish power by calling the All-Byelorussian National Congress, in which 1872 delegates were gathered to discuss the future of the nation. While contingents of the organization voted in the Rada, a council of representatives for Byelorussia, the Communist Party played an active role in suppressing the Rada, causing them to go underground.

The 1930s saw the Communist Party of Byelorussia targeted most heavily by Stalin’s purges. The vast majority of high-profile figures were arrested and removed, while an additional 40% of all members were also removed (Marples 1999, 8-9) Having taken place during Stalin’s infamous purges, much of the socially and culturally significant gains that the occurred—such as the return of exiled individuals, a resurrection of language, among other cultural developments that had begun in the 1920s—had become halted, affecting Byelorussian culture and society for some significant time. 1937 especially saw the highest rate of purges throughout the Party, but arrests and removals of key figures continued well into the 1940s. These formative years tended to halt specific social developments pushed by the Communist Party, hindering much for the Byelorussian Soviet Socialist Republic.

July 28, 1990, from Art. 6 of the Constitution of the Byelorussian SSR, the provision on the monopoly of the Communist Party of Byelorussia on power was excluded.

From August 25, 1991, to February 3, 1993, the activities of the Communist Party of Belarus were suspended.

On April 25, 1993, at the XXXII (extraordinary) congress of the Communist Party of Belarus, it was decided to join the party in the Party of Communists of Belarus (PCB).

First Secretaries of the Communist Party of Byelorussia

See also

Belarusian United Left Party "A Just World"
Communist Party of Belarus

References

Political parties of the Russian Revolution
Political parties established in 1918
Political parties disestablished in 1993
Defunct political parties in Belarus
Parties of one-party systems
Byelorussia
Communist parties in Belarus
Byelorussia
1918 establishments in Belarus
1993 disestablishments in Belarus
Communist parties in the Soviet Union
Byelorussian Soviet Socialist Republic